Up the Creek may refer to:

 Up the Creek (1958 film), a British comedy film, directed by Val Guest
 Further Up the Creek, a 1958 sequel film, also directed by Guest
 Up the Creek (1984 film), an American comedy film
 "Up the Creek" (song), leading theme song from the film, performed by Cheap Trick
 Up the Creek (web series), an American comedy web series
 Up the Creek (comedy club), Greenwich, London
 "Up the Creek", an episode of the Teletoon and Cartoon Network TV series Total Drama Island
 "Up the Creek", a song by Tori Amos from the 2017 album Native Invader